Cheshmeh Sib-e Deli Khomsir (also Romanized as Cheshmeh Sīb-e Delī Khomsīr; also known as Cheshmeh Sīb) is a village in Kabgian Rural District, Kabgian District, Dana County, Kohgiluyeh and Boyer-Ahmad Province, Iran. At the 2006 census, its population was 64, in 17 families.

References 

Populated places in Dana County